In mathematics, the arguments of the maxima (abbreviated arg max or argmax) are the points, or elements, of the domain of some function at which the function values are maximized. In contrast to global maxima, which refers to the largest outputs of a function, arg max refers to the inputs, or arguments, at which the function outputs are as large as possible.

Definition 

In the fields of convex analysis and variational analysis, a slightly different definition is used in the special case where  are the extended real numbers.
 

where it is emphasized that this equality involving  holds  when  is not identically  on

Arg min 
For instance,

are points  for which  attains its smallest value. It is the complementary operator of 

Examples and properties 

For example, if  is  then  attains its maximum value of  only at the point  Thus 

The  operator is different from the  operator.

 is the element in 

Like  max may be the empty set (in which case the maximum is undefined) or a singleton, but unlike   may not contain multiple elements: for example, if  is  then  but  because the function attains the same value at every element of 

We can rearrange to give the simple identity

So, for example,

For example

 so an infinite set.

As another example,  although  is bounded by  However, by the extreme value theorem, a continuous real-valued function on a closed interval has a maximum, and thus a nonempty

See also

 Argument of a function
 Maxima and minima
 Mode (statistics)
 Mathematical optimization
 Kernel (linear algebra)
 Preimage

Notes

References

External links

Elementary mathematics
Inverse functions